Ingölü Dam is a dam completed in 1977 for irrigation purposes on Divrikçayır in Giresun.

References 

 http://www2.dsi.gov.tr/baraj/baraj_arama.cfm

Dams in Turkey
1977 establishments in Turkey
Buildings and structures in Giresun Province
Dams completed in 1977